Greg Dawson (born 6 June 1989) is a New Zealand cricketer. He played in six first-class matches for Canterbury in 2014 and 2015.

See also
 List of Canterbury representative cricketers

References

External links
 

1989 births
Living people
New Zealand cricketers
Canterbury cricketers
Cricketers from Invercargill